Swinging Suites by Edward E. & Edward G. (also known as Peer Gynt Suite/Suite Thursday) is an album by American pianist, composer and bandleader Duke Ellington recorded for the Columbia label in 1960 featuring a jazz interpretation of Peer Gynt by Grieg and Ellington's tribute to John Steinbeck's Sweet Thursday, co-written by Billy Strayhorn. The album was rereleased on CD as Three Suites along with Ellington's reworking of Tchaikovsky's The Nutcracker in 1990.

Reception 
The Allmusic review awarded the album 4½ stars.  

In the 1960s, the Royal Swedish Academy of Music made a statement, referring to a Swedish law paragraph called "Klassikerskyddet" ("Protection of Classics") in the copyright legislation, that Duke Ellington's jazz versions on the album were "offending to the nordic music culture". Ellington withdrew the album and the case was never tried in court.

In 1992, The New York Times reviewed a live performance of Ellington's Peer Gynt adaption: "The pieces, with their dense and gorgeous harmonies, lend themselves perfectly to live performance" and "the melody kept peeking around creamy harmonies, hurtling up-tempo sections abruptly merged with ballads".

Track listing 
Selections from "Peer Gynt" suites No. 1 and 2 written by Edvard Grieg adapted by Duke Ellington
 "Morning Mood" – 4:24  
 "In the Hall of the Mountain King" – 2:33  
 "Solvejg's Song" – 3:59  
 "Ase's Death" – 3:47  
 "Anitra's Dance" – 2:58
"Suite Thursday" written by Duke Ellington and Billy Strayhorn  
 "Misfit Blues" – 4:09  
 "Schwiphti" – 3:04  
 "Zweet Zurzday" – 3:56  
 "Lay-By" – 4:50  
Recorded in Los Angeles on June 28 (tracks 1 & 5), June 29 (tracks 3 & 4), June 30 (track 2), and October 10 (tracks 6–9), 1960.

Personnel 
Duke Ellington – piano
Willie Cook, Fats Ford, Eddie Mullins, Gerald Wilson (track 2) – trumpet
Ray Nance,  – trumpet, violin (on "Lay-By") (uncredited)
Lawrence Brown, Matthew Gee, Booty Wood, Britt Woodman (tracks 1–5) – trombone
Juan Tizol – valve trombone
Jimmy Hamilton – clarinet, tenor saxophone
Johnny Hodges (tracks 1–5), Paul Horn (tracks 6–9) – alto saxophone 
Russell Procope – alto saxophone, clarinet
Paul Gonsalves – tenor saxophone
Harry Carney – baritone saxophone
Aaron Bell – bass 
Sam Woodyard – drums

References 

Columbia Records albums
Duke Ellington albums
1960 albums
Peer Gynt (Grieg)